= Włodzimierz Kryszewski =

Polish historian and encyclopedist

Włodzimierz Kryszewski (Polish pronunciation: [vwɔˈd͡ʑimjɛʂ krɨˈʂɛfskʲi]; 20 March 1923 – 3 December 2004) was a Polish historian and encyclopedist. He was born in Toruń, Poland.

During the Second World War Kryszewski was member of Armia Krajowa. From 1942 until 1945 prisoner of several German concentration camps, among others of Auschwitz.

== Works ==
- Pojęcia typologiczne w naukach humanistycznych ("Ruch Filozoficzny"" 1950)
- Teoria typów idealnych M. Webera jako narzêdzie badañ humanistycznych ("Ruch Filozoficzny"" 1951)
- Encyklopedie uniwersalne w krajach socjalistycznych - problemy naukowe... ("Przegląd Humanistyczny" 1983 nr 12)
